Manuel Francisco Antonio Julián Montt Torres (September 4, 1809 – September 21, 1880) was a Chilean statesman and scholar. He was twice elected President of Chile between 1851 and 1861.

Biography
Montt was born in Petorca, Valparaíso Region, the son of Catalan immigrants. His family was very poor, and in 1822, the death of his father increased their hardship. The same year, Manuel's mother secured his entrance into the Instituto Nacional (National Institute), where he also would serve as rector later in life (1835–40), though he could only afford the fees by tutoring other students. After studying law at the Instituto Nacional, he graduated as a lawyer in 1833 and soon achieved prominent academic and government posts.

Montt had a distinguished career as a scholar, and was introduced into public life during the presidency (1831–1841) of José Joaquín Prieto by Diego Portales. Montt distinguished himself by his courage in the crisis that followed upon Portales' assassination in 1837, though only holding a subordinate post in the government. In 1840, Montt was elected to the National Congress of Chile. He served as minister of the interior and minister of justice under President Manuel Bulnes (1841–51). He emphasized the need for educational and scientific advancement in the Chile, and was Minister of public instruction for a time. He was also twice Minister of Interior and Foreign Affairs during the Bulnes administration.

In 1849, botanist Claude Gay published Monttea, a genus of flowering plants from Argentina and Chile, belonging to the family Plantaginaceae in Manuel Montt's honour.

In 1851 Montt won the presidency, but the liberals thought his election was fraudulent and instigated an armed revolt, the Revolution of 1851, which was quickly subdued. Montt represented the conservative oligarchy and was authoritarian and inflexible in his beliefs, but he also worked for the economic and social progress of his nation. He angered the conservatives when he asserted the state's right of patronage in Chile's Roman Catholic Church and when he supported the abolition of restrictions on the sale or bequeathing of landed estates. His administration made advances in commerce and banking, codified Chilean laws, strongly promoted public education and immigration, and colonized the area south of the Bío-Bío River.

Manuel Montt was the first civilian president and furthered the reforms begun by Diego Portales. With Vicente Perez Rosales, the Minister of Immigration, he encouraged the settlement of German immigrants in the south of the country. The city of Puerto Montt, at the centre of the newly settled lands, was named after him. He governed Chile with an energy and wisdom that laid the foundation of her material prosperity. He was ably assisted by his minister of the interior Antonio Varas, and it was from the union of the two statesmen that the well-known ultra-conservative faction, the Montt-Varistas, took their name. His presidency was marked by the establishment of railways, telegraphs, banks, schools and training-colleges. Near the end of his second term, when Montt indicated a preference for Varas, his minister of the interior, to be his successor, liberals again staged an armed uprising. Montt again subdued the revolt but pacified the liberals by shifting his support to José Joaquín Pérez, who was a moderate.

On giving up the presidency in 1861, Montt became President of the Supreme Court, a position which he held up to his death in September 1880. His nephew Jorge (born 1846) was president of Chile in 1891–1896, as well as his son, Pedro (died 1910), between 1906 and 1910.

See also
Montt family

References

Sources
P. B. Figueroa, Diccionario biografico de Chile, 1550–1887 (Santiago, 1888)
J. B. Suarez, Rasgos biograficos de hombres notables de Chile (Valparaiso, 1886)

External links

Short biography  
Genealogical chart of Montt family 

1809 births
1880 deaths
People from Petorca
Chilean people of Catalan descent
Manuel Montt
Presidents of Chile
Supreme Court of Chile members
Chilean Ministers of the Interior
Foreign ministers of Chile
Chilean Ministers of Defense
Conservative Party (Chile) politicians
National Party (Chile, 1857) politicians
Instituto Nacional General José Miguel Carrera alumni
Candidates for President of Chile